Aerius may refer to:

 Aerius of Sebaste, a presbyter of Sebaste in Pontus in the 4th century
 Desloratadine, a drug used to treat allergies
Aerius (band), an American djent band formed 2016